Armagnostus is an extinct genus from a well-known class of fossil marine arthropods, the trilobites. It lived during the Cambrian Period, which lasted from approximately 539 to 485 million years ago.

References

Agnostida genera
Cambrian trilobites
Fossils of Antarctica
Fossils of Kazakhstan